WB Games Montréal Inc. is a Canadian video game developer based in Montreal, Quebec. It is a subsidiary of Warner Bros. Games and is best known for developing Batman: Arkham Origins and Gotham Knights.

History
 
WB Games Montréal was founded in 2010 by Warner Bros. Interactive Entertainment (now Warner Bros. Games).

One of the studio's titles, Batman: Arkham Origins, was displayed for the public at the 2013 Electronic Entertainment Expo (E3), and received two nominations from the Game Critics Awards for Best Action/Adventure Game and Best Console Game. Upon Batman: Arkham Origins'''s release it received positive reviews. However, the company received a significant amount of criticism for failing to conduct proper testing on the game prior to release as well as refusing to address a number of game-breaking bugs that plagued the title, instead preferring to focus on the development and release of paid DLC.

During an interview on the Humans of Gaming Podcast in October 2018, WB Games Montréal Senior Game Designer Osama Dorias confirmed that two DC Comics-based video games are currently in development at the studio. At DC FanDome in August 2020, the studio announced Gotham Knights''.

Games developed

Additional work

References

External links
 

Video game companies established in 2010
Warner Bros. Games
Video game companies of Canada
Video game development companies
Companies based in Montreal
2010 establishments in Quebec
Canadian companies established in 2010
Canadian subsidiaries of foreign companies